Club Seven was an Australian television variety series which aired from 1959 to 1961. It aired on Melbourne station HSV-7, broadcast live at 10:00PM on Thursdays. Hosts of the series included Terry Scanlon and Frank Wilson. The series faced tough competition from GTV-9's popular In Melbourne Tonight. At least part of an episode is known to exist and is available for viewing on YouTube.

Night-club setting
In the 20 August 1959 edition of The Age newspaper, a writer for the newspaper said that the series was unsuccessful in recreating the night-club atmosphere, and said the Sydney-produced ABC series Cafe Continental was more successful at creating such an atmosphere. In fact, the use of such a setting was a somewhat common one on early television, having also been used by the 1957-1959 HSV-7 series The Late Show, which was the predecessor of Club Seven. Rendezvous at Romano's (1957, TCN-9) may have also featured such a setting. Additionally, the setting (or a similar restaurant cabaret setting) was also used by American series The Morey Amsterdam Show (1948-1950), The Ilona Massey Show (1954-1955, DuMont), Hold That Camera (1950, DuMont), Café de Paris (1949, DuMont), and the unrelated series Club Seven (1948-1951, ABC). Additionally, British series Café Continental (1947–1953, BBC) used such a setting, as did early Canadian series Nightcap.

References

External links

Seven Network original programming
1959 Australian television series debuts
1961 Australian television series endings
Australian variety television shows
Black-and-white Australian television shows
English-language television shows
Australian live television series
Australian comedy television series